Undibacterium amnicola is a Gram-negative, strictly aerobic and motile bacterium from the genus of Undibacterium which has been isolated from wather from the Funglin Stream in Taiwan.

References

External links
Type strain of Undibacterium amnicola at BacDive -  the Bacterial Diversity Metadatabase

Burkholderiales
Bacteria described in 2017